This article is a list of public art in Varberg, Sweden.

References 

Varberg